Shane O'Meara (born 26 April 1992) is an Irish actor, known for his roles as Connor Mulgrew in the BBC One school-based drama series Waterloo Road and Sean Donoghue in the BBC medical soap opera, Doctors.

Personal life
O'Meara was born in Ireland on 26 April 1992. He grew up in Livingston, Scotland, and attended St. Margaret's Academy. He has two brothers, Ryan and Allen, and a sister, Sionainn. He attended Edinburgh Telford College from 2009–2010 studying Drama and pursuing a National Certificate in Acting and Performance. He also attended Dundee College from 2010–2011, studying for a Higher National Certificate in Acting and Performance. O'Meara later moved to Manchester, England.

Career
O'Meara is best known for playing Connor Mulgrew in the eighth and ninth series of Waterloo Road, as the son of Christine Mulgrew (Laurie Brett), a new English teacher then Headteacher. O'Meara left the programme in January 2014 before making two reappearances in March 2014. He has also played Sean Donoghue in the award-winning BBC soap Doctors in 2015. In 2014, he appeared on the CBBC panel show The Dog Ate My Homework. He also appeared in the award-winning short Wifey Redux as a young Aiden McArdle in 2015. O’Meara is currently set to star in the movie adaptation of Peter Flannery's best selling novel First and Only.

References

External links

Irish male child actors
Irish male television actors
1992 births
Living people
Irish expatriates in Scotland